Ozark is an unincorporated community in Adair County, Kentucky, United States located along the Louie B Nunn Cumberland Parkway and east of Columbia, Kentucky.  Its elevation is 883 feet (269m).

References

Unincorporated communities in Adair County, Kentucky
Unincorporated communities in Kentucky